Nyhavn 67 is a listed property overlooking the Nyhavn Canal in central Copenhagen, Denmark. The writer Hans Christian Andersen lived in the building as a lodger with only short interruptions from 1848 to 1865.

History

17th and early 18th centuries

History

Early history

Thecoppersmith Henrik Ehm purchased a large property at the site in 1682, comprising all the properties now known as Nyhavn5969 and Kvæsthusgade 24. His property was listed in Copenhagen's first cadastre of 1689 asNo. 20 in St. Ann's East Quarter.

The property was later divided into a number of smaller properties. The present building was constructed in 1737 for merchant Jens Sørensen Bøsholt. The property was listed in the new cadastre of 1756 as No. 34 in St. Ann's East Quarter. It was owned by stadsmægler Carl Wilder (16981865) at that time. In 1872, he purchased Andreas Bjørn's former dockyard on the other side of the harbour. It was after his death passed down to his son Lars Wilder. Wilders Plads are still named after them.

Johan Buntzen, 17801807

District doctor Johan Buntzen resided in the building from  the 1780s and until his death in 1807. At the time of the 1787 census, Johann Buntzen	resided in his building with his mother-in-law Christine Sandgaard, his five daughters (aged five to 14), the 21-year-old niece Elisabeth Burmester, four clerks working for him, a caretaker and three maids. The eldest of the five daughters, Thomasine, later known as Thomasine Gyllembourg, was engaged to her house teacher Peter Andreas Heiberg when she was just 15 years old and they were married at the Royal Copenhagen Shooting Society's premises outside the Western City Gate on 7 May 1790.

By 1801, Thomasine Heiberg had moved back to her father's house, now with the 10-year-old son Johan Ludvig Heiberg, after her husband had fled the country.

In the new cadastre of 1806, the property was again listed as No. 34. It wasstill owned by Johan Buntzen at that time.

1834 census
No. 34 was home to 16 residents in  five households at the time of the 1834 census. Christen Hansen Høyer, a skiper, resided on the ground floor with his wife Ane Christine Høyer and one maid.  Christian August Lassen, a high-ranking civil servant in the naval administration at Holmen, resided on the first floor with his wife Emilie Nannethe Cathala, their three children (aged two to 11) and two maids. Søren Christensen and Poul Friderig Gliorup, a first mate and a jurist, respectively, resided on the second floor.  Christian Bohn, a skipper, resided in the garret with his sister Johanne Bohn. Dorthea Maria Christens, the proprietor of the tavern in the basement, resided in the associated dwelling with one lodger.

1840 census
The property was home to 17 residents in five households at the 1840 census. Christian Hans Høyer, a skipper, resided on the ground floor with his wife Anna Cathrine Høyer f. Møller and one maid. Judithe Gjødevad (née Kiellerup, 1788-1850), widow of naval captain Jens Berlin Giødvad  (1782-?), resided on the first floor with a housekeeper (husjomfru) and a maid. Christian Bøhn, a skipper, resided on the second floor with his sister Jomfru Johanne Bøhn and one lodger. Hans Madsen, a master hatter, resided on the second floor with his wife Madam Therese Madsen (née Høfding) and their 25-year-old son 	August Wilhelm Madsen. The son was employed as a cook at the royal residences. Anna Dorthea Bruun, a laundry lady, resided in the basement with her four children (aged six to 14).

Anholm and Hans Christian Andersen

The building was later acquired by ship captain Johannes Anholm. He ran the building as a boarding house under the name stadt Christiania. In 1846, he heightened the building with one floor.

As of 1 October 1849, Hans Christian Andersen rented three rooms on the second floor. Andersen mentions his home at Nyhavn 67 in a number of letters. He first mentions it in a letter to Bernhard Severin Ingemann where he comments on the magnificent view of Christianshavn, all of Holmen and of Børsen. In a letter written to Henriette Collin on 18 October 1860, Andersen mentions that he wants to move. One of his concerns is that there are too many clocks and he therefore asks her to look for a new apartment, preferably on Kongens Nytorv or the Garrison Square, where he can stay from 1 December. In a letter from 20 November 1860, Henriette Collin answers that Edvard (Collin) has booked a nice room for him at Hotel d'Angleterre overlooking the square. In a letter from 6 June 1861, Henriette Collin mentions that Mrs. Anholm has asked for his address and that she wants him to move back. Andersen ended up accepting the offer but spent the summers in the countryside as a guest at various manor houses and the rooms in Nyhavn are then rented out to other lodgers. In a letter to Edvard Collin from 11 February 1866, Andersen mentions that he gave up his rooms at Nyhavn 67 back in September. He initially went on a journey to Sweden and then stayed at Hotel d'Angleterre before setting out on a new journey on 31 January. After his return to Denmark, Andersen stayed with the Melchior family at their country house  Rolighed before lodging with Thora Hallager in Lille Kongensgade from 28 October 1856.

Christoffer Adolf Leth	
 
The property was later acquired by Harbour Inspector in Copenhagen Christoffer Adolf Leth (1796-1868). His property was home to 16 residents in four households at the 1860 census. The resided in the building with his wife Frederikke Cecilia Leth (née Hastrup), their four children (aged  14 to 26) and two maids. Olivia Holm, an unmarried woman in her 50s, resided in the building with one maid. Anthon Wilhelm Scheel, General Auditor (generalauditør) for Landetaten, resided in the building with his housekeeper Vilhelmine Christine Gröttau. Lars Mortensen Bau, a helmsman who now operated a tavern in the basement, resided in the associated dwelling with his wife Anne Marie Bau (née Burman), a lodger and one maid.

20th century to present

Monberg & Thorsen co-founder Axel Monberg purchased the building in the early 1940s. He carried out a comprehensive renovation of the building in 1944–1945 with the assistance of the architect Svend G. Høyrup (1897-1977).

The property was later owned by the architect Preben Hansen (19081989), It was after his death owned by his widow Ruth Preben Hansen (19172000s) until her own death in the 2000s.

Architecture
The house consists of five floors over a high cellar and is just three bays wide. The key stone above the main entrance features the name "1737" and the initials of the building's first owner. The terrace in front of the recessed fifth floor was created by Høyrup in connection with his renovation of the building for Monberg in the 1940s.

Today
Café H. C. Andersen is based in the ground floor. The upper floors contain apartments and offices. The building was sold for DKK 25 million in 2008.

Cultural references
Anne Marie Ejrnæs
s biographical Som Svalen (Like the Swallow) about Thomasine Gyllembourg begins when she is eight years old at lives in her father's house at Nyhavn 67.

Further reading
 Egevang, Robert and Hartmann, Godfred : Et Hus I Nyhavn Et Københavnsk Miljø Gennem 300 År (1973=

References

External links

 Source about Hans Christian Andersen and Nyhavn 67
 Source

Listed residential buildings in Copenhagen
Residential buildings completed in 1737
Buildings in Copenhagen associated with Hans Christian Andersen